The 1920 Ebbw Vale by-election was held on 26 July 1920.  The by-election was held due to the resignation of the incumbent Labour MP, Thomas Richards.  The Labour candidate Evan Davies was unopposed and declared as the victor.

References

1920 in Wales
1920s elections in Wales
History of Blaenau Gwent
1920 elections in the United Kingdom
By-elections to the Parliament of the United Kingdom in Welsh constituencies
Unopposed by-elections to the Parliament of the United Kingdom (need citation)